The 34th Young Artist Awards ceremony, presented by the Young Artist Association, honored excellence of young performers between the ages of 5 to 21 in the fields of film, television and theatre for the 2012 calendar year.  The 34th annual ceremony also marked the first year the association recognized achievements of young internet performers with the inaugural presentation of the award for "Best Web Performance".

Nominees were announced on Sunday March 31, 2013, and subsequent voting was undertaken by former Youth in Film Award/Young Artist Award winners, from 1979 to 2011.  Winners were announced on Sunday, May 5, 2013 at the annual ceremony and banquet luncheon in the Empire Ballroom of the Sportsmen's Lodge in Studio City, California.

Live musical entertainment at the ceremony included Indiana based country pop group Jetset Getset and Los Angeles based vocalist Agina Alvarez.  Following the death of Young Artist Association president and founder, Maureen Dragone on February 8, 2013, it was announced that the 34th Annual ceremony would also feature a memorial tribute in her honor.

Established in 1978 by long-standing Hollywood Foreign Press Association member, Maureen Dragone, the Young Artist Association was the first organization to establish an awards ceremony specifically set to recognize and award the contributions of performers under the age of 21 in the fields of film, television, theater and music.

Categories
★ Bold indicates the winner in each category.

Best Performance in a Feature Film

Best Performance in a Feature Film – Leading Young Actor
★ Tom Holland – The Impossible – Warner Brothers
 Jared Gilman – Moonrise Kingdom – Focus Features
 Zachary Gordon – Diary of a Wimpy Kid: Dog Days – Fox 2000
 Quinn Lord – Imaginaerum – Nordisk Films
 Jason Spevack – Jesus Henry Christ – Entertainment One
 Christian Traeumer – The Child – Stealth Media Group

Best Performance in a Feature Film – Leading Young Actress
★  (tie) Kathryn Newton – Paranormal Activity 4 – Paramount Pictures
★  (tie) Quvenzhané Wallis – Beasts of the Southern Wild – Fox Searchlight Pictures
 Tara Lynne Barr – God Bless America – Magnolia Pictures
 Kara Hayward – Moonrise Kingdom – Focus Features

Best Performance in a Feature Film – Young Actor Ten and Under
★ CJ Adams – The Odd Life of Timothy Green – Walt Disney Pictures
 Chandler Canterbury – A Bag of Hammers  – MPI
Riley Thomas Stewart – The Lucky One – Warner Brothers

Best Performance in a Feature Film – Supporting Young Actor
★  (tie) Robert Capron – Diary of a Wimpy Kid: Dog Days – Fox 2000
★  (tie) Austin MacDonald – Jesus Henry Christ – Entertainment One
 Karan Brar – Diary of a Wimpy Kid: Dog Days – Fox 2000
Zach Callison – Rock Jocks – Intelligent Life Media
 Alex Ferris – In Their Skin – IFC Films
 Daniel Huttlestone – Les Miserables – Universal Pictures
Samuel Joslin – The Impossible – Warner Brothers
 Gulliver McGrath – Dark Shadows – Warner Brothers

Best Performance in a Feature Film – Supporting Young Actress
★ Savannah Lathem – California Solo – Cherry Sky Films
 Maude Apatow – This Is 40 – Universal Pictures
 Mackenzie Foy – The Twilight Saga: Breaking Dawn – Part 2 – Summit Entertainment
 Joey King – The Dark Knight Rises – Warner Brothers
 Laine MacNeil – Diary of a Wimpy Kid: Dog Days – Fox 2000
 Odeya Rush – The Odd Life of Timothy Green – Walt Disney Pictures

Best Performance in a Feature Film – Supporting Young Actor Ten and Under
★ Sebastian Banes – In the Family – In The Family Productions
 Kyle Harrison Breitkopf – Parental Guidance – 20th Century Fox
Cameron M. Brown – Abraham Lincoln: Vampire Hunter – 20th Century Fox
 Connor & Owen Fielding – Diary of a Wimpy Kid: Dog Days – Fox 2000
 Pierce Gagnon – Looper – Sony Pictures
Joseph Paul Kennedy – Nature Calls – Magnet Releasing
Oaklee Pendergast – The Impossible – Warner Brothers
 John Paul Ruttan – This Means War – 20th Century Fox
 Joshua Rush – Parental Guidance – 20th Century Fox

Best Performance in a Feature Film – Supporting Young Actress Ten and Under
★ Isabelle Allen – Les Miserables – Universal Pictures
Dalila Bela – Diary of a Wimpy Kid: Dog Days – Fox 2000
Lexi Cowan – Promised Land – Focus Features
Raevan Lee Hanan – Cloud Atlas – Warner Brothers
 Emma Rayne Lyle – Why Stop Now – BCDF Pictures

Best Performance in a Feature Film – Young Ensemble Cast
★ Diary of a Wimpy Kid: Dog Days – Fox 2000Zachary Gordon, Robert Capron, Peyton List, Karan Brar, Laine MacNeil, Connor & Owen Fielding, Devon Bostick, Grayson RussellParental Guidance – 20th Century Fox
Bailee Madison, Joshua Rush, Kyle Harrison Breitkopf

Best Performance in an International Feature Film
Best Performance in an International Feature Film – Young Actor
★ Antoine Olivier Pilon – Les Pee-Wee 3D – CanadaMahmoud Asfa – When I Saw You ( لما شفتك ) – Palestine
Teo Gutierrez Romero – Infancia Clandestina (Clandestine Childhood) – Argentina
Rick Lens – Kauwboy (Jackdaw Boy) – Netherlands
Emilien Neron – Monsieur Lazhar (Mister Lazhar) – Canada

Best Performance in an International Feature Film – Young Actress
★ Alice Morel-Michaud – Les Pee-Wee 3D – CanadaFátima Buntinx – Las Malas Intenciones (The Bad Intentions) – Peru
Tessa la González – Después de Lucía (After Lucia) – Mexico
 Sophie Nélisse – Monsieur Lazhar (Mister Lazhar) – Canada

Best Performance in a Short Film
Best Performance in a Short Film – Young Actor
★ Connor Beardmore – When I Grow Up, I Want To Be A Dinosaur – Capilano UniversityDakota Bales – A.B.S. – Phish Tank Philms
Joshua Bales – A.B.S. – Phish Tank Philms
Mark D'Sol – A.B.S. – Phish Tank Philms
Jonathon Tyler Ford – No Hitter – Independent
Andy Scott Harris – The Stone on the Shore – Chapman University
 Joey Luthman – Tough Guy – Powder Films
Caon Mortenson – A.B.S. – Phish Tank Philms
Matthew Nardozzi – May – Independent
Brandon Tyler Russell – Transcendence – Shipman Media

Best Performance in a Short Film – Young Actress
★ Jolie Vanier – Hello, My Name is Abigail – BFA Film ProductionsBrighid Fleming – A.B.S. – Phish Tank Philms
Carol Huska – Breaking Over Me – York University
 Leeah D. Jackson – A Mother's Choice: The Ultimatum – Star Trac Productions
Chanel Marriott – Bombay Beach – Screen Australia
Brea Renee – A Mother's Choice: The Ultimatum – Star Trac Productions
Kiana Lyz Rivera – The Supplement – Cat Eye Productions
Courtney Robinson – A.B.S. – Phish Tank Philms
Jordan Van Vranken – Detention – Independent

Best Performance in a Short Film – Young Actor 11 and 12
★  (tie) Dawson Dunbar – A Strange Day in July – Independent★  (tie) Christian Traeumer – Bolero – Wildflower FilmsBrady Bryson – Under the Big Top – Independent
Samuel Caruana – Kickstart Theft – BandPro Films
Joshua Costea – Lucid – Team Jugular Knott
Josh Feldman – The Sleepover – Independent
Tanner Saunders – Say Lovey – Capilano University
Tai Urban – Hiding Game – Urban Media Group

Best Performance in a Short Film – Young Actress 11 and 12
★ Paris Smith – Scouted – IndependentAva Allan – Billie Speare – Tramline Entertainment
Jade Aspros – Life Doesn't Frighten Me – LDFM Films
Tara-Nicole Azarian – ROTFL – Front Porch Films
Laci Kay – Olivia – Colirio Films
Ashley Lonardo – Clear Revenge – Lonardo Productions
Elise Luthman – More Than Words – AFI
Ashley Lynn Switzer – Handbag – Barefoot Girl Productions

Best Performance in a Short Film – Young Actor Ten and Under
★ Nicolas Neve – A Sunflower – TASA ProductionsAlexander Almaguer – The Best Man – Columbia College Chicago
Peter Bundic – Man of the House – Independent
Richard Davis – The Comeback Kid – Ryerson Short
Jack Fulton – Night Light – CFC
Edward Sass III – The Cure – Densely Hollow Films

Best Performance in a Short Film – Young Actress Ten and Under
★  (tie) Katelyn Mager – When I Grow Up, I Want To Be A Dinosaur – Capilano University★  (tie) Hannah Swain – Geronimo – APASI ProductionsEliana Calogiros – By My Side – Blackspear Productions
Genea Charpentier – The Old Woman in the Woods – Independent
Megan Charpentier – The Old Woman in the Woods – Independent
Kaitlin Cheung – Frank – Capilano University
Maia Costea – Maia – Kinoeye Productions
Bianca D'Ambrosio – Voodoo the Right Thing – Mansfield Productions
Chiara D'Ambrosio – Voodoo the Right Thing – Mansfield Productions
Jada Facer – Nina Del Tango – Lens Flare Films
Eliza Faria – A Strange Day in July – Independent
Bridget Jeske – Rumpelstiltskin – Celluloid Social Club
Peyton Kennedy – The Offering – CFC Productions
Ariyena Koh – Little Mao – CAA Media
Veronica McFarlane – Nobody's Victim- AFI
 Savannah McReynolds – Transcendence – Shipman Media
Alisha Newton – No Place Like Home – Independent
Alisha-Jo Penney – Like Smoke – Sakaria Film
Marlowe Peyton – How To Get To Candybar – White Eagle Productions

Best Performance in a TV Movie, Miniseries, Special or Pilot
Best Performance in a TV Movie, Miniseries, Special or Pilot – Leading Young Actor
★  (tie) Josh Feldman – Santa Paws 2: The Santa Pups – Disney★  (tie) Sean Michael Kyer – Anything But Christmas – ION Television Tucker Albrizzi – Shmagreggie Saves the World – Disney XD
 Dylan Everett – Frenemies – Disney Channel
 Trevor Jackson – Let It Shine – Disney Channel
 Joey Luthman – The Joey and Elise Show – DATV

Best Performance in a TV Movie, Miniseries, Special or Pilot – Leading Young Actress
★ Kyla Kennedy – Raising Izzie – GMC-TVLeah Lewis – Fred 3: Camp Fred – Nickelodeon
Elise Luthman – The Joey and Elise Show – DATV
 Bella Thorne – Frenemies – Disney Channel
 Zendaya – Frenemies – Disney Channel

Best Performance in a TV Movie, Miniseries, Special or Pilot – Supporting Young Actor
★ Valin Shinyei – Christmas Miracle – Vivendi EntertainmentEmjay Anthony – Applebaum – CBS
Darien Provost – The Christmas Consultant – Lifetime

Best Performance in a TV Movie, Miniseries, Special or Pilot – Supporting Young Actress
★ Eliza Faria – The Christmas Consultant – LifetimeElla Ballentine – Baby's 1st Christmas – Hallmark
Dalila Bela – A Fairly Odd Christmas – Nickelodeon
Olivia Steele Falconer – A Fairly Odd Christmas – Nickelodeon
Danielle Parker – The Seven Year Hitch – Hallmark
Marlowe Peyton – Applebaum – CBS
Bobbie Prewitt – Animal Practice – NBC
Rowan Rycroft – Duke – Hallmark
Siobhan Williams – Christmas Miracle – Vivendi Entertainment

Best Performance in a TV Series
Best Performance in a TV Series – Leading Young Actor
★ Blake Michael – Dog with a Blog – Disney Channel Jared Gilmore – Once Upon a Time – ABC
 Patrick Johnson – Necessary Roughness – USA Network
 David Mazouz – Touch – FOX
 Chandler Riggs – The Walking Dead – AMC

Best Performance in a TV Series – Leading Young Actress
★  (tie) Savannah Paige Rae – Parenthood – NBC★  (tie) Torri Webster – Life with Boys – NickelodeonLayla Crawford – The First Family – Entertainment Studios
 Christine Prosperi – Degrassi: The Next Generation – CTV
 Olivia Scriven – Degrassi: The Next Generation – CTV
Victory Van Tuyl -Marvin Marvin – Nickelodeon

Best Performance in a TV Series – Supporting Young Actor
★ Tyree Brown – Parenthood – NBC Karan Brar – Jessie – Disney Channel
 Max Charles – The Neighbors – ABC
Seth Isaac Johnson – The Killing – AMC
 Maxim Knight – Falling Skies – TNT
 Austin MacDonald – Debra! – Family Channel
Ian Patrick – The Neighbors – ABC
 Isaac Hempstead Wright – Game of Thrones – HBO

Best Performance in a TV Series – Supporting Young Actress
★ Alisha Newton – Heartland – CBCTaylor Blackwell – Magic City – Starz Network
Isabella Cramp – The Neighbors – ABC
Madison Lintz – The Walking Dead – AMC
 Sophie Turner – Game of Thrones – HBO
 Maisie Williams – Game of Thrones – HBO

Best Performance in a TV Series – Guest Starring Young Actor 14–21
★  (tie) Shak Ghacha – Touch – FOX★  (tie) Joey Luthman – Kickin' It – Disney XDConnor Beardmore – Fringe – Warner Brothers
LJ Benet – Bones – FOX
Harrison Thomas Boxley – Kickin' It – Disney XD
Michael Chey – New Girl – FOX
Donnie MacNeil – R.L. Stine's The Haunting Hour – The Hub Network
Daniel Polo – Touch – FOX

Best Performance in a TV Series – Guest Starring Young Actress 17–21
★ Erin Sanders – Fresh Beat Band – Nick Jr.Katlin Mastandrea – Anger Management – FX
 Jennifer Veal – Victorious – Nickelodeon

Best Performance in a TV Series – Guest Starring Young Actress 14–16
★ Isabella Palmieri – Good Luck Charlie – Disney ChannelJaylen Barron – Bones – FOX
Chelsey Bryson – The Secret Life of the American Teenager – ABC Family Channel
Sadie Calvano – Kickin' It – Disney XD
Madison Curtis – Kickin' It – Disney XD
 Laine MacNeil – Falling Skies – TNT

Best Performance in a TV Series – Guest Starring Young Actor 11–13
★ Mateus Ward – Weeds – ShowtimeBrady Bryson – Celebrity Ghost Stories – Biography Channel
Parker Contreras – Victorious – Nickelodeon
Lucky Davis – Southland – Turner Network
Joe D'Giovanni – Victorious – Nickelodeon
Jake Elliot – 2 Broke Girls – CBS
Gregory Kasyan – Hawaii Five-0 – CBS
 Quinn Lord – Once Upon a Time – ABC
 Robbie Tucker – Awkward – MTV

Best Performance in a TV Series – Guest Starring Young Actress 11–13
★ Annika Horne – Army Wives – LifetimeTaylor Blackwell – Army Wives – Lifetime
Mandalynn Carlson – CSI: New York – CBS
Hannah Eisenmann – Criminal Minds – CBS
Olivia Steele Falconer – Falling Skies – TNT
Brighid Fleming – Awake – NBC
Bella King – Leverage – TNT
 Madison Leisle – Stevie TV – VH1
 Kiernan Shipka – Don't Trust the B---- in Apartment 23 – ABC

Best Performance in a TV Series – Guest Starring Young Actor Ten and Under
★ Bruce Salomon – Emily Owens, M.D. – CW NetworkThomas Barbusca – The New Normal – NBC
Jet Jurgensmeyer – Austin & Ally – Disney Channel

Best Performance in a TV Series – Guest Starring Young Actress Ten and Under
★ Charlotte White – Private Practice – ABCElla Anderson – A.N.T. Farm – Disney Channel
 Melody Angel – How to Rock – Nickelodeon
Sage Boatright – Victorious – Nickelodeon
 Caitlin Carmichael – Retired at 35 – TV Land
Namaiya Cunningham – Lazytown Super Sproutlet – PBS
Giana Gomez – Good Luck Charlie – Disney Channel
Kyla Kennedy – The New Normal – NBC
Rylan Lee – Victorious – Nickelodeon
 Emma Rayne Lyle – Law and Order: Special Victims Unit – NBC
Danielle Parker – Don't Trust the B---- in Apartment 23 – ABC
Alissa Skobye – R.L. Stine's The Haunting Hour – The Hub Network

Best Performance in a TV Series – Recurring Young Actor 17–21
★ Brock Ciarlelli – The Middle – ABC Austin MacDonald – Life with Boys – Nickelodeon
 RJ Mitte – Breaking Bad – AMC
Lyle O'Donohoe – Degrassi: The Next Generation – CTV
Mikey Reid – Victorious – Nickelodeon

Best Performance in a TV Series – Recurring Young Actress 17–21
★ Frederique Dufort – Unité 9 – Radio Canada (TV)Katlin Mastandrea – The Middle – ABC
 Erin Sanders – Big Time Rush – Nickelodeon

Best Performance in a TV Series – Recurring Young Actor
★ Martin Holden Weiner – Mad Men – AMC Trevor Jackson – Eureka – NBC
Nicky Korba – Shameless – Showtime
 Robert Naylor – Being Human – SyFy
 Brandon Soo Hoo – Supah Ninjas – Nickelodeon

Best Performance in a TV Series – Recurring Young Actress
★  (tie) Addison Holley – My Babysitter's a Vampire – Disney Channel★  (tie) Kiernan Shipka – Mad Men – AMCJaylen Barron – See Dad Run – Nickelodeon
Lucy and Josie Gallina – Boardwalk Empire – HBO
Kayla Maisonet – Dog with a Blog – Disney Channel
Lauren Dair Owens – New Girl – FOX

Best Performance in a TV Series – Recurring Young Actor Ten and Under
★ Rory and Declan McTigue – Boardwalk Empire – HBOTyler Champagne – The Client List – Lifetime
Stone Eisenmann – New Girl – FOX

Best Performance in a Daytime TV Series – Young Actor
★ Daniel Polo – The Young and the Restless – CBSAndrew Trischitta – One Life to Live – ABC
 Terrell Ransom, Jr – Days of Our Lives – NBC

Best Performance in a Daytime TV Series – Young Actress
★ Samantha Bailey – The Young and the Restless – CBS Haley King – The Young and the Restless – CBS
 Haley Pullos – General Hospital – ABC

Best Performance in a Daytime TV Series – Young Actress Ten and Under
★ Brooklyn Rae Silzer – General Hospital – ABCCheyanna Prelesnik – General Hospital – ABC
Campbell Rose – Days of Our Lives – NBC

Outstanding Young Ensemble in a TV Series
★ The Neighbors – ABC Max Charles, Isabella Cramp, Ian PatrickIncredible Crew – Cartoon Network
Shauna Case, Shameik Moore, Tristan Pasterick, Chanelle Peloso, Jeremy Shada, Brandon Soo Hoo

Best Performance in a Voice-Over Role
Best Performance in a Voice-Over Role (Feature Film) – Young Actor
★ Charlie Tahan – Frankenweenie – Walt Disney Pictures Tucker Albrizzi – Paranorman – Focus Features
 Kodi Smit-McPhee – Paranorman – Focus Features

Best Performance in a Voice-Over Role (Television) – Young Actor
★  (tie) Zach Callison – Sofia the First: Once Upon a Princess – Walt Disney Pictures★  (tie) Jake Sim – The Magic Hockey Skates – Amberwood Entertainment Jacob Ewaniuk – The Cat in the Hat Knows a Lot About That! – PBS
Graeme Jokic – Franklin and Friends – Nelvana
 Jet Jurgensmeyer – Special Agent Oso – Disney Channel
 Regan Mizrahi – Dora the Explorer – Nickelodeon
Mark Ramsey – Franklin and Friends – Nelvana

Best Performance in a Voice-Over Role (Television) – Young Actress
★ Caitlin Carmichael – Doc McStuffins – Disney ChannelAddison Holley – Daniel Tiger's Neighborhood – PBS
Nissae Isen – Mike the Knight – Nelvana
Ashleigh Midanik – The 99 – EWD
 Kiernan Shipka – The Legend of Korra – Nickelodeon
Alexa Torrington – The Cat in the Hat Knows a Lot About That! – PBS

Best Performance in a DVD Film
Best Performance in a DVD Film – Young Actor
★  (tie) Ryan Hartwig – The Aggression Scale – Anchor Bay Entertainment★  (tie) Brandon Tyler Russell – Smitty – Tri Coast StudiosDavid Chandler – FDR American Badass – Screen Media Films
Zach Louis – Golden Winter – The Asylum
Valin Shinyei – A Christmas Story 2 – Warner Brothers
Austin Wolff – Golden Winter – The Asylum

Best Performance in a DVD Film – Young Actress
★ Jordan Van Vranken – After the Wizard – Breaking Glass Pictures Caitlin Carmichael – The Dog Who Saved the Holidays – Starz Home Entertainment
Layla Crawford – Note to Self – BET/Viacom
Cassidy Mack – Chilly Christmas – Anchor Bay Entertainment
Siobhan Williams – Flicka: Country Pride – 20th Century Fox Home Ent.

Best Web Performance
Best Web Performance – Young Actor
★ Luke Broyles – Up in Arms – Wild Monkey ProductionsAlex Dale – Up in Arms – Wild Monkey Productions
 Dawson Dunbar – Written By a Kid – Geek and Sundry
Garret Palmer – Up in Arms – Wild Monkey Productions
Michael Pena – Teens Wanna Know – Pena Talent and Productions
Nathaniel Pena – Teens Wanna Know – Pena Talent and Productions
Ivan Quijano – Up in Arms – Wild Monkey Productions
Ethan Singal – Drugs Not 4 Me – Team Seven Entertainment

Best Web Performance – Young Actress
★ Ariel Fournier – Beyond the Spotlight – Talent GPSCamden Angelis – Totally Amp'd – Shaftesbury Films
Madison Curtis – Up in Arms – Wild Monkey Productions
Victoria Grace – Up in Arms – Wild Monkey Productions
Emily Jordan – Up in Arms – Wild Monkey Productions
Brandi Alyssa Young – The Dark One – Insidious Set Productions

Best Performance in Live Theater
Best Performance in Live Theater – Young Actor
★ Matthew Nardozzi – Lyle the Crocodile – Orlando Repertory Theatre, FloridaL.J. Benet – Waiting for Godot – Mark Taper Forum, California
Sean Eaton – The Square Root of Wonderful – The Raven Playhouse, California
Lewis Grosso – Newsies – Nederlander Theatre, New York
Aidan Wessels – The Music Man – Theatre Under the Stars, Vancouver
Jordan Wessels – All the Way Home – Electric Company Theatre, Vancouver

Best Performance in Live Theater – Young Actress
★ Camden Angelis – Mary Poppins – Cadillac Theatre, ChicagoElla Ballentine – Numbers – Factory Theatre, Toronto
Brielle Barbusca – Other People's Organs – The Blank Theatre, California
Sydney Rose – Dr. Seuss' How the Grinch Stole Christmas! The Musical – The Old Globe Theatre, California
Jolie Vanier – Charlie and the Chocolate Factory – Hudson Theatre, California

Special awards
Mickey Rooney Former Child Star Award
★ Melissa Joan Hart – Clarissa Darling in the Nickelodeon series Clarissa Explains It All and Sabrina Spellman in ABC's Sabrina, the Teenage Witch

Jackie Coogan Award

Contribution to Youth Through Entertainment
★ Barbara Gasser, Journalist – "Rote Nasen" ("Clown Doctors")

Social Relations of Knowledge Institute Award
★ Nova: Hunting the Elements with David Pogue – PBS

References

External links
Official site
34th Young Artist Awards red carpet arrivals at Maximo TV

Young Artist Awards ceremonies
2012 film awards
2012 television awards
2013 in American cinema
2013 in American television
2013 in California